The Municipality of Vaucluse was a local government area of Sydney, New South Wales, Australia. The municipality was proclaimed as the "Borough of Vaucluse" on 1 May 1895, seceding from the Municipality of Woollahra, and included the modern suburbs of Vaucluse and Watsons Bay. The council was re-amalgamated with Woollahra to the south with the passing of the Local Government (Areas) Act 1948.

Council history and location

The area was first incorporated on 20 April 1860 as part of the Bellevue Ward of the Municipality of Woollahra. However, after the passing of the Municipalities Act, 1867 which allowed for residents to petition the government to secede as their own council area, the idea of a separate municipal council for the areas of Vaucluse and Watsons Bay at the northern end of the Borough of Woollahra gained ground amongst a large group of local residents. In late 1894 a petition was published in the NSW Government Gazette, calling for the area's separation as the "Borough of Vaucluse" on the basis that, among a general sense of a lack of representation and equitable distribution of rate revenue investment, "that the interests of the residents of the area ... and of the remaining portion of the said Borough of Woollahra are entirely different, and that they form virtually separate communities".

Despite the objections of Woollahra Council, on 29 March 1895 the Borough of Vaucluse was proclaimed by the Governor of New South Wales, with the southern boundary comprising Towns Road and Bay View Hill Street and the eastern boundary being Old South Head Road. On 15 May 1895, the first council, comprising nine aldermen in one electorate, was elected (John White the younger, Albert Jones, Harold Francis Norrie, John Dykes, Hugh Stirling Patterson, Herbert Chudleigh, David McCulloch, Charles John Edward Forssberg, William Jack), with Albert Jones elected as the first mayor at the first meeting on 21 May 1895. The first Council Clerk, Edwin Stanhope Sautelle, was appointed on 1 June 1895. With the passage of the Local Government Act 1906, borough ceased to be category of local government area and the Borough of Vaucluse was renamed the "Municipality of Vaucluse".

The council first met in a temporary premises in Watsons Bay, with the old timber customs house and former Gap Inn building at 17 Military Road, Watsons Bay, serving this purpose until more permanent premises could be built. In early 1909, the council voted to commission new council chambers on the Military Road site to a Free Classical design by architect, Varney Parkes. Completed in early 1910 by builders Pocock & Stevens to a cost of £2,500, the new Town Hall was officially opened on 20 April 1910 by the Secretary for Public Works, Charles Lee.

Later history
In September 1924, Vaucluse Council sold the Town Hall and acquired the nearby Royal Hotel (later renamed Dunbar House) directly opposite Watsons Bay for use as a new Council Chambers. The new Council Chambers were officially opened by the Minister for Local Government, John Fitzpatrick, on 1 November 1924.

By the end of the Second World War, the NSW Government had realised that its ideas of infrastructure expansion could not be effected by the present system of the mostly-poor and smaller inner-city municipal councils and the Minister for Local Government, Joseph Cahill, passed a bill in 1948 that abolished a significant number of those councils. Under the Local Government (Areas) Act 1948, Vaucluse Municipal Council was merged back into the larger neighbouring Municipality of Woollahra. The last meeting of Vaucluse Council was held at Dunbar House on 13 December 1948.

Mayors

Town Clerks

References

Vaucluse
Vaucluse
Vaucluse
Vaucluse
Vaucluse, New South Wales
Watsons Bay, New South Wales